Lower Prospect is a rural residential community of the Halifax Regional Municipality in the Canadian province of Nova Scotia on the Chebucto Peninsula. It was the location of the 1873 sinking of the SS Atlantic.

References
 Explore HRM

Communities in Halifax, Nova Scotia
General Service Areas in Nova Scotia